Bence Béres (born 26 August 1992 in Komárom) is a short track speed skater set to represent Hungary at the 2014 Winter Olympics.

References

External links
 

1992 births
Living people
Hungarian male short track speed skaters
Olympic short track speed skaters of Hungary
Short track speed skaters at the 2014 Winter Olympics
People from Komárom
Universiade gold medalists for Hungary
Universiade medalists in short track speed skating
Competitors at the 2013 Winter Universiade
Sportspeople from Komárom-Esztergom County
20th-century Hungarian people
21st-century Hungarian people